Eric Vloeimans (born 24 March 1963) is a Dutch musician, songwriter, and record producer.

Biography

Although he studied classical music as a child, he became interested in jazz at the Rotterdam Academy of Music. After graduating in 1988, he moved to New York City and studied trumpet with Donald Byrd. He was a member of big bands led by Mercer Ellington and Frank Foster. In the 1990s, he recorded the album Bitches and Fairy Tales (1999) with Marc Johnson, Joey Baron, and John Taylor. Vloeimans has also worked with Kinan Azmeh, Michiel Borstlap, Lars Danielsson, Jimmy Haslip, Joe LaBarbera, Nguyên Lê, Ernst Reijseger, and Bugge Wesseltoft.

Awards and honors
 Edison Award, Bitches and Fairy Tales, 1999
 Boy Edgar Award, Umai, 2001
 Bird Award, Best Jazz Trumpeter, 2002
 Gouden Nutcracker, Dutch Jazz Album, Heavensabove, 2011

Discography

As leader
 No Realistics (Art in Jazz, 1992)
 First Floor (Challenge, 1994)
 Bestiarium (Challenge, 1996)
 Bitches and Fairy Tales (Challenge, 1998)
 Zwart wit Bimhuis Live (BV Haast, 1999)
 Umai (Challenge, 2000)
 Brutto Gusto (Challenge, 2002)
 Hidden History (Challenge, 2003)
 Boompetit (Challenge, 2004)
 Nocturnal Ghost Songs (Basta, 2005)
 Summersault (Challenge, 2006)
 The Compositions of Eric Dolphy with Alex Coke, Willem Breuker (BV Haast, 2006)
 Gatecrashin'  (Challenge, 2007)
 Hyper (Challenge, 2008)
 Live at Yoshi's (Challenge, 2009)
 Heavens Above! (Challenge, 2009)
 Live at the Concertgebouw with Florian Weber (Challenge, 2011)
 North Sea Jazz Legendary Concerts (Bob City, 2013)
 Pessoa (Coast to Coast 2013)
 Party Animals (V-Flow, 2020)

As sideman
With Michel Banabila
 Urban Jazz Scapes (Javaanse Jongens, 2003)
 Music for Viola and Electronics II (Tapu, 2015)
 New Land (Tapu, 2017)

With Michiel Borstlap
 The Sextet Live! (Challenge, 1995)
 Body Acoustic (EmArcy 1999)
 Liveline (EmArcy, 2000)

With Martin Fondse
 Upperground (BV Haast, 1998)
 Ere Ibeji (BV Haast, 2001)
 Fragrant Moondrops (Basta, 2009)
 Testimoni (Basta, 2012)

With others
 Jan Akkerman, Minor Details (Digimode, 2011)
 Jan Akkerman, North Sea Jazz Legendary Concerts (Bob City, 2013)
 Kinan Azmeh, Jeroen Van Vliet, Eric Vloeimans' Levanter (V-Flow, 2018)
 Bob Brookmeyer, Waltzing With Zoe (Challenge, 2001)
 Calefax, On the Spot (Challenge, 2013)
 Pierre Courbois, Live in Germany (A Records, 1996)
 Pierre Courbois, Reouverture (A Records, 1996)
 Freek de Jonge, Zonde (V2, 2013)
 Rob de Nijs, Vanaf Vandaag (Capitol, 2004)
 Chris Hinze, Senang (Keytone, 1996)
 Brigitte Kaandorp, Thuis (Doek Op 2015)
 Jacek Kochan, Another Blowfish (Not Two, 2002)
 Michael Moore, Osiris (Ramboy, 2006)
 Michael Moore, Rotterdam (Ramboy, 2011)
 Enrico Pieranunzi, Alone Together (Challenge, 2001)
 Ntjam Rosie, The One (Gentle Daze, 2015)
 Florian Ross, Lilacs and Laughter (Naxos, 2000)
 Sandhya Sanjana, Random Access Melody (LopLop, 2009)
 Jarmo Savolainen, Grand Style (A Records, 2000)
 Jarmo Savolainen, Times Like These (A Records, 2002)
 Armin van Buuren, Embrace (Armada, 2015)
 Jasper van 't Hof, Ballads of Timbuktu (Jaro Medien, 2002)
 Jasper van 't Hof, NeverNeverLand (Jaro Medien, 2005)

References

External links

 Official site

1963 births
Living people
Dutch jazz trumpeters
Musicians from Rotterdam
21st-century trumpeters
Challenge Records (1994) artists
Codarts University for the Arts alumni